Filipe Miranda Cunha Pinto known as Filipe Pinto (born in São Mamede de Infesta, Matosinhos municipality, Portugal on 3 July 1988) is a Portuguese singer that won season 3 of the Portuguese reality television music competition series Ídolos in 2010. He won the 2013 MTV Europe Music Award for the Best Portuguese Act.

Ídolos
Pinto auditioned with the Pearl Jam song "Better Man".

During the gala live shows, he sang:
Gala 1: Radiohead - "High and Dry"
Gala 2: Smashing Pumpkins - "Disarm"
Gala 3: Foo Fighters - "Times Like These"
Gala 4: Michael Jackson - "Billie Jean"
Gala 5: Zeca Afonso - "Venham mais Cinco"
Gala 6: Amy Winehouse - "Valerie"
Gala 7: Roberto Carlos - "Quero que tudo vá Pro Inferno" / U2 - "With or Without You"
Gala 8: Guns N' Roses - "Sweet Child o' Mine" / Incubus - "Drive"
Gala 9: Carlos Santana - "Smooth" / Ornatos Violeta - "Ouvi Dizer" / Oasis - "Don't Look Back in Anger"
Gala 10: Whitesnake - "Here I Go Again" (as a duet with Diana) / Goo Goo Dolls - "Iris" / Nirvana - "Lithium" / Pedro Abrunhosa - "Eu Não Sei Quem Te Perdeu" (in duet with Pedro Abrunhosa)
Gala 12: Bush - "Letting the Cables Sleep" / Pearl Jam - "Better Man" / Ornatos Violeta - "Ouvi Dizer"

He won the final against competition from the finalist and eventual runner-up Diana Piedade. In addition to a record contract, he won a 6-month scholarship to study music at London College of Music. In March 2010, Ídolos also released the compilation album Ídolos Os Melhores Momentos that included Pinto's interpretation of "Ouvi Dizer".

After Ídolos
After the finals, he took part in a tour with the rest of the finalists. He also took part in a series of festivals in 2011 including Super Bock Super Rock and Festival Sudoeste. After his win, he completed his education with a degree in Forestry from University of Trás-os-Montes and Alto Douro.

His debut commercial single was "Insónia" followed by his debut studio album Cerne on Farol Records in 2012.

Discography

Albums

Singles
2012: "Insónia"
2015: "E Tudo Gira"
2017: "Amor tem Si"

References

Idols (TV series) winners
1988 births
Living people
21st-century Portuguese male singers
MTV Europe Music Award winners